Frederick E. Draper (3 April 1873 in Troy, New York – 1951), Republican, represented the Thirty-first Senate District in the 144th and the 145th New York State Legislature.

He received his education in the public schools of Troy, Williams College (1895), Harvard Law School, 1898.

Draper served as a private in the Spanish war. He was admitted to the practice of law in 1898, specializing in corporations, commercial law, bankruptcy and estates.  From 1908-1914 he was judge of the city court of Troy. During the World War, he was chairman of local exemption board No. 3.

Draper was married to Mary J. Mann Draper, and fathered three children.

References

1873 births
1951 deaths
Republican Party New York (state) state senators
Williams College alumni
Harvard Law School alumni